is a 1999 Japanese film directed by Takashi Miike, and is the third film in his Black Society trilogy, following 1995's Shinjuku Triad Society and 1997's Rainy Dog. Like many of Miike's works, the film examines the underbelly of respectable Japanese society and the problems of assimilation faced by non-ethnically Japanese people in Japan. The English title refers to ley lines, the paranormal concept of geographic lines of energy based on the placement of landmarks.

Plot
Ryuichi, his younger brother Shunrei, and their friend Chang are a trio of Japanese youths of Chinese descent who escape their semi-rural upbringing and relocate to Shinjuku, Tokyo. Their wallets are stolen by a Shanghai prostitute nicknamed "Killer Pussy" so they turn to selling bottles of the recreational inhalant toluene in order to earn money. They later make up with the prostitute, whose real name is Anita, when she quits selling her body after being abused by a client and then her pimp.

The three youths buy fake passports and a gun through the black market, intending to stow away on a boat to Brazil. Together with Anita, they rob money from the Chinese crime boss Wong, during which Anita kicks her former pimp. Ikeda and Barbie of the toluene ring ambush them and shoot Chang before the others escape. Triad members arrive and Barbie tells them that Ikeda took the money before they shoot him dead. Chang dies in the car after asking the others to give his share of the money to his mother. Shunrei quickly pedals his bike to the Zhang Fu Diner and gives Chang's mother Chang's share of the money but is caught and run over by Wong's men in a truck on his way back. While Ryuichi and Anita are searching for him, Wong's men spot them and chase them in the truck before smashing into a pile of corrugated metal and dying.

Ryuichi and Anita reach the port and give money to the shipowner but discover Wong waiting for them. Anita shoots Wong dead, then Ryuichi and Anita jump into the water and money goes floating everywhere as Wong's men fire repeatedly into the water. Ryuichi and Anita are then shown rowing a boat away, though they are covered in blood, presumably indicating that they are already dead.

Cast

Kazuki Kitamura as Ryuichi
Tomorowo Taguchi as Chan
Dan Li as Anita/Chinese prostitute
Naoto Takenaka as Wong
Michisuke Kashiwaya as Shunrei
Samuel Pop Aning as Barbie
Show Aikawa as Ikeda
Far-Long Oh as Anita's pimp
Takeshi Caesar
Yukie Itou
Yōzaburō Itō as Anita's sadistic client
Ryūshi Mizukami
Ren Osugi as Junkyard Owner
Manzō Shinra
Shun Sugata as Cop
Kōji Tsukamoto as Passport Official
Tetsu Watanabe
Hua Rong Weng

Release
Ley Lines was released in theatres in Japan on May 22, 1999 in Japan.

Reception
Sight & Sound found the film to be the "most accomplished" of Miike's Black Society trilogy, where "Miike's stylistic flamboyance is balanced by narrative coherence." The review negatively pointed out that "There are moments of sexual horror that play awkwardly for laughs and the immigrant experience isn't explored in great depth, but this is a highly compelling work." Grady Hendrix (The New York Sun), referred to the film as "the most technically accomplished of the Black Society Trilogy".

References

Footnotes

Sources

External links 
 

1990s Japanese-language films
Films directed by Takashi Miike
Yakuza films
Triad films
Daiei Film films
Films about prostitution in Japan
Films set in Tokyo
1990s Japanese films
1990s Hong Kong films